Nova Vas ob Sotli is a small village on the right bank of the Sotla River southeast of Bizeljsko in the Municipality of Brežice in eastern Slovenia. The area is part of the traditional region of Styria. It is now included in the Lower Sava Statistical Region.

References

External links
Nova Vas ob Sotli on Geopedia

Populated places in the Municipality of Brežice